The 2019 Philippine Basketball Association (PBA) Governors' Cup
also known as the 2019 Honda–PBA Governors' Cup for sponsorship reasons was the third and final conference of the 2019 PBA season. The tournament allows teams to hire foreign players or imports with a height limit of 6'5".

Format
The tournament format for this conference is as follows:
 Single-round robin eliminations; 11 games per team; Teams are then seeded by basis on win–loss records. 
Top eight teams will advance to the quarterfinals.  In case of tie, a playoff game will be held only for the #8 seed.
Quarterfinals (higher seed with the twice-to-beat advantage):
QF1: #1 seed vs #8 seed
QF2: #2 seed vs #7 seed
QF3: #3 seed vs #6 seed
QF4: #4 seed vs #5 seed
Semifinals (best-of-5 series):
SF1: QF1 vs. QF4 winners
SF2: QF2 vs. QF3 winners
Finals (best-of-7 series)
Winners of the semifinals

Elimination round

Team standings

Schedule

Results

Bracket

Quarterfinals

(1) NLEX vs. (8) NorthPort

(2) Meralco vs. (7) Alaska

(3) TNT vs. (6) Magnolia

(4) Barangay Ginebra vs. (5) San Miguel

Semifinals

(2) Meralco vs. (3) TNT

(4) Barangay Ginebra vs. (8) NorthPort

Finals

Imports 
The following is the list of imports, which had played for their respective teams at least once, with the returning imports in italics. Highlighted are the imports who stayed with their respective teams for the whole conference.

Awards

Conference 
The Best Player and Best Import of the Conference awards were handed out prior to Game 4 of the Finals, at the Smart Araneta Coliseum:
Best Player of the Conference:  Christian Standhardinger 
Best Import of the Conference: Allen Durham 
Finals MVP: Japeth Aguilar

Players of the Week

Statistics

Individual statistical leaders

Local players

Import players

Individual game highs

Local players

Import players

Team statistical leaders

References

External links
 PBA Official Website

Governors' Cup
PBA Governors' Cup